Héctor Antonio Astudillo Flores (born 3 July 1958) is a Mexican lawyer and politician affiliated with the Institutional Revolutionary Party who served as the Governor of Guerrero from 2015 to 2021. He had previously served as Senator of the LVIII and LIX Legislatures of the Mexican Congress representing Guerrero and as Municipal President of Chilpancingo de los Bravo between 2009 and 2012.

On June 9, 2020, Governor Astudillo Flores reported he had contracted COVID-19 pandemic in Mexico but that he planned to continue remote working. As of this date, Guerrero reported 2,325 confirmed cases and 347 deaths from the virus.

References

1958 births
Living people
Politicians from Guerrero
People from Chilpancingo
Members of the Senate of the Republic (Mexico)
Institutional Revolutionary Party politicians
National Autonomous University of Mexico alumni
21st-century Mexican politicians
Governors of Guerrero
20th-century Mexican lawyers
Members of the Congress of Guerrero
Municipal presidents in Guerrero